Lexemuel Ray Hesler (20 February 1888 – 20 November 1977) was an American mycologist. He was the son of Clinton F. Hesler and Laura Iris (née Youngblood). He obtained his B.A. degree with Wabash College in 1911 and his Ph.D. at the University of Cornell in 1914.

Selected publications
Hesler LR. (1929) "A preliminary report on polypores of eastern Tennessee", Journal of the Tennessee Academy of Science 4: 3–10
Hesler LR.  (1936) "Notes on southern Appalachian fungi", Journal of the Tennessee Academy of Science 6: 107–122
Hesler LR. (1937) "Notes on southern Appalachian fungi: II.", Journal of the Tennessee Academy of Science 12: 239–254
Hesler LR. (1937) "A preliminary list of the fungi of the Great Smoky Mountains",  Castanea 2: 45–58
Hesler LR. (1957) "Notes on southeastern Agaricales: I.",  Journal of the Tennessee Academy of Science 32: 298–307
Hesler LR. (1960) "A study of Russula types: ",  Memoirs of the Torrey Botanical Club 21: 1–59
Hesler LR. (1961) "A study of Julius Schaeffer's Russulas",  Lloydia 24: 182–198
Hesler LR. (1961) "A Study of Russula types: 2", Mycologia 53: 605–625
Hesler LR, Smith AH. (1963) North American Species of Hygrophorus
Hesler LR, Smith AH. (1965) North American species of Crepidotus
Hesler LR. (1967) Entoloma in Southeastern North America
Smith AH, Hesler LR. (1968) The North American species of Pholiota
Hesler LR. (1969) North American species of Gymnopilus
Hesler LR, Smith AH. (1979) North American Species of Lactarius

See also
 :Category:Taxa named by Lexemuel Ray Hesler
 List of mycologists

References

External links
University of Tennessee Finding Aid for the Lexemuel Ray Hesler Collection, 1899–1982

American mycologists
1888 births
1977 deaths
Wabash College alumni
Cornell University College of Agriculture and Life Sciences alumni